Reginald Lee Chun Hei (born 25 January 1994) is a Hong Kong badminton player.
He is a former Asian Champion and World Championships bronze medalist in the mixed doubles category partnered with Chau Hoi Wah.

Career 
Reginald Lee Chun Hei participated in the 2010 BWF World Junior Championships and placed third. He placed fifth a year later. 2012 he started at the Asian Badminton Championships and represented his country in the qualification for the Thomas Cup. He is a former Asian Champion and bronze medalist in the World Championships in the mixed doubles category partnered with Chau Hoi Wah.

Achievements

BWF World Championships 
Mixed doubles

Asian Championships 
Mixed doubles

East Asian Games 
Men's doubles

Mixed doubles

BWF World Junior Championships 
Boys' doubles

Asian Junior Championships 
Boys' doubles

BWF World Tour (1 title, 1 runner-up) 
The BWF World Tour, which was announced on 19 March 2017 and implemented in 2018, is a series of elite badminton tournaments sanctioned by the Badminton World Federation (BWF). The BWF World Tour is divided into levels of World Tour Finals, Super 1000, Super 750, Super 500, Super 300, and the BWF Tour Super 100.

Mixed doubles

BWF Superseries (1 title) 
The BWF Superseries, which was launched on 14 December 2006 and implemented in 2007, was a series of elite badminton tournaments, sanctioned by the Badminton World Federation (BWF). BWF Superseries levels were Superseries and Superseries Premier. A season of Superseries consisted of twelve tournaments around the world that had been introduced since 2011. Successful players were invited to the Superseries Finals, which were held at the end of each year.

Mixed doubles

 BWF Superseries Finals tournament
 BWF Superseries Premier tournament
 BWF Superseries tournament

BWF Grand Prix (3 titles, 2 runners-up) 
The BWF Grand Prix had two levels, the Grand Prix and Grand Prix Gold. It was a series of badminton tournaments sanctioned by the Badminton World Federation (BWF) and played between 2007 and 2017.

Mixed doubles

 BWF Grand Prix Gold tournament
 BWF Grand Prix tournament

BWF International Challenge/Series (2 titles, 4 runners-up) 
Men's doubles

Mixed doubles

  BWF International Challenge tournament
  BWF International Series tournament
  BWF Future Series tournament

References

External links 

 
 

1994 births
Living people
Hong Kong male badminton players
Badminton players at the 2016 Summer Olympics
Olympic badminton players of Hong Kong
Badminton players at the 2014 Asian Games
Badminton players at the 2018 Asian Games
Asian Games competitors for Hong Kong